Stefan Gebhardt (born 5 March 1974) is a German politician of The Left. Since 2019, he has been the leader of the party's Saxony-Anhalt branch. He has been a member of the Landtag of Saxony-Anhalt since 1998, and a member of the Mansfeld-Südharz district council since 2007.

Personal life
Gebhardt attended Polytechnic Secondary School, and from 1990 to 1992, the Markt Hettstedt high school. This was followed by a three-year course as a nurse at the Aschersleben district hospital, which he completed in 1996. He then worked as a nurse in the same hospital until 1998.

Political career
Gebhardt joined the Party of Democratic Socialism (PDS) in 1991. He was spokesman for the Hettstedt branch of the party's youth association from 1994 to 2004, and was a member of the PDS district board of Mansfelder Land from 1994 to 1998. He served on the city council of Hettstedt from 1999 to 2005. Since 2007, Gebhardt has been a member of the Mansfeld-Südharz district council.

He was elected to the Landtag of Saxony-Anhalt on the PDS state list in the 1998 state election. He was re-elected in 2002. In May 2005, he resigned during the course of a public prosecutor's investigation. He was returned to the Landtag in the 2006 election, and was once again re-elected in 2011 and 2016.

Gebhardt is a member of the Committee on Federal and European Affairs and the Media, as well as the Committee on Education and Culture. He is also a member of the MDR Broadcasting Council and the ARD program advisory board.

On 29 June 2019, Gebhardt was elected as the state chairman of The Left, winning 69.5% of votes.

References

1974 births
Living people
People from Mansfeld-Südharz
The Left (Germany) politicians
21st-century German politicians
Members of the Landtag of Saxony-Anhalt